Spirotropis monterosatoi is a species of sea snail, a marine gastropod mollusk in the family Drilliidae.

Taxonomy
Bouchet & Warén (1980) placed S. sarsi Warén, 1975 and S. carinata of Mediterranean authors in the synonymy of this species, but this was shown to be incorrect by Janssen (1993).

Description
The size of an adult shell varies between 14 mm and 26 mm.

Distribution
This species occurs in the demersal zone between Iceland and Norway, down to northwest Africa; in the Mediterranean Sea.

References

 Janssen R. (1993) Taxonomy, evolution and spreading of the turrid genus Spirotropis (Gastropoda: Turridae). Scripta Geologica, Special Issue 2, 237–261
 Gofas, S.; Le Renard, J.; Bouchet, P. (2001). Mollusca, in: Costello, M.J. et al. (Ed.) (2001). European register of marine species: a check-list of the marine species in Europe and a bibliography of guides to their identification. Collection Patrimoines Naturels, 50: pp. 180–213
  Tucker, J.K. 2004 Catalog of recent and fossil turrids (Mollusca: Gastropoda). Zootaxa 682:1–1295

External links
 Locard, A. (1897-1898). Expéditions scientifiques du Travailleur et du Talisman pendant les années 1880, 1881, 1882 et 1883. Mollusques testacés. Paris, Masson.
 

monterosatoi
Gastropods described in 1904